The black-whiskered vireo (Vireo altiloquus) is a small passerine bird, which breeds in southern Florida, USA, and the West Indies as far south as the offshore islands of Venezuela. It is a partial migrant, with northern birds wintering from the Greater Antilles to northern South America. This species has occurred as a rare vagrant to Costa Rica.

Habitat
The breeding habitat is open deciduous wooded areas and cultivation, and in Florida also mangroves. The black-whiskered vireo builds a cup nest in a fork of a tree branch, and lays 2-3 white eggs.

Description
This vireo is 14–15 cm in length, has a 25 cm wingspan and weighs 17–19 g. It has thick blue-grey legs and a stout bill.

The adult black-whiskered vireo has dull olive-green upperparts and white underparts, with yellowish on the flanks and under the tail. It has red eyes and a grey-brown crown with faint dusky edges. There is a dark line through the eyes and a white eyebrow stripe. There is a distinctive black line (the "whisker") on the neck sides. Juvenile birds are similar, but have brown-red eyes.

This species is similar to red-eyed vireo, but is duller and browner above, and is best distinguished by the black whisker mark. The song is a three-syllable whip, Tom Kelly, more abrupt than that of red-eyed vireo.

The Florida race V. a. barbatulus is shorter-billed by 15% than the northern Caribbean subspecies  V. a. bonairensis. The latter form has occurred in the US as a vagrant to Florida and Louisiana.

Diet and behavior
The black-whiskered vireo gleans insects from tree foliage, sometimes hovering while foraging. It will also eat small quantities of berries

This bird suffers from nest parasitism by the brown-headed cowbird in its US range, and shiny cowbird further south.

References

 A guide to the birds of Costa Rica by Stiles and Skutch

External links
 Black-whiskered Vireo Bird Sound

black-whiskered vireo
Native birds of the Eastern United States
Birds of the Caribbean
Birds of the Dominican Republic
black-whiskered vireo
black-whiskered vireo